Toulouse Engelhardt, (born April 14, 1951, Milwaukee, Wisconsin) is an acoustic guitarist and the last member of the Takoma Seven, a group of fingerstyle guitarists who recorded for Takoma Records from 1959 to 1976. The group included John Fahey, Peter Lang, and Leo Kottke.

Biography
Thomas Lloyd Engelhardt is the younger of two sons of Alan and Arlene Engelhardt. After moving to the west coast, first to San Francisco in 1953, his family migrated south to Hermosa Beach, California, and in 1956 settled in Palos Verdes Estates, California, where he graduated from Palos Verdes High School in 1969. Engelhardt developed his first interest in guitar at the age of six when he heard surf music.

Although he lacks formal training in guitar technique and music theory, Engelhardt did receive impromptu lessons from two established jazz guitarists of the 1960s: Wes Montgomery and Larry Carlton.
 His first guitar lesson was from Carlton, who taught him how to play "Walk, Don't Run" by The Ventures. In the summer of 1966, at the age of fifteen, Engelhardt was given tips in technique by Montgomery while they were at the backstage door of the Lighthouse Café in Hermosa Beach.

Engelhardt's break came in 1973 when he was booked as a support act for The Byrds' final American tour. In 1975, he signed with Briar Records, a subsidiary of Fahey's Takoma label. After the release of his first album, he became disillusioned by his experiences in the music industry. He took a ten-year sabbatical and returned to college to pursue two academic degrees in the natural sciences. In the early 1990s he was awarded a master's degree from California State University, Fullerton in botany. He has been adjunct professor of biology at community colleges in Southern California.

Although he left his solo career in those years, he played as an occasional sideman for Adrian Belew, Jack Bruce, Ry Cooder, Dick Dale, and David Lindley and many others. In 1994, Sierra Records in affiliation with Hollywood Records; a division of Walt Disney Productions Inc, reissued Toullusions. He was rediscovered by guitar fans and returned to performing, composing and recording works for solo guitar.

Engelhardt's compositions are arranged for six-string or twelve-string guitar acoustic or Mosrite electric guitar, written in a tone poem style. His style combines folk music, acoustic blues, jazz, ragtime, and surf music.

Engelhardt has been noted for his work by Guitar Player magazine in their Reader's Poll nomination for Best Acoustic Fingerstyle Guitarist. At the Virgin Islands Film Festival, he won a silver medal for contributing to the soundtrack "Winter Equinox". He was awarded "Best Jazz Artist" Orange County Music Awards and is recently acknowledged in numerous "Best of the best" guitar fandom articles: ″100 Gifted Guitarists-You Should Know″ (TrueFire.webarchive) and ″100 Greatest Finger Style Guitarist″ 2018' (entertainment.expertscolumn.com)

Discography
 Toullusions Sierra/Briar/Takoma, 1976) 
 Winter Equinox (Festival, 1978)
 Toullusions (Hollywood, 1994)
 Acoustic Guitar Highlights Vol. 3 (Solid Air, 1995)
 A Child's Guide to Einstein (Lost Grove Arts, 2004)
 Martian Lust (Lost Grove Arts, 2006)
 Lubbock Lights" EP (Lost Grove Arts, 2008)
 Perpendicular Worlds (Lost Grove Arts, 2009)
 Acoustic Guitar Highlights (Solid Air, 2011) 
 Toulousology (Lost Grove Arts, 2012)
 Mind Gardens (Lost Grove Arts, 2015)
 Three Novellas for Guitar and Orchestra'' (Five & Dime Universe Inc, 2023)

References

External links
 Official site
 The Legend of Toulouse Engelhardt
 Engelhardt 11/2010
 Engelhardt 12/2010
 {http://www.easyreadernews.com/.../Guitarist legend Wes Montgomery mentors 15-year-old Toulouse Engelhardt at the Lighthouse Jazz Cafe
 {http://www.shindig-magazine.com/.../"Strength of Strings" Acoustic Guitar Virtuoso Toulouse Engelhardt recalls a life changing visit by THE BYRDS   to his high school in the autumn 1965. Issue #109 Pg. 71 Nov. 2020.

Fingerstyle guitarists
1951 births
Living people